Walnut Street may refer to:

Walnut Street (Philadelphia)
Walnut Street (Pittsburgh)
Walnut Street station (disambiguation), stations of the name

See also
Walnut Street Bridge (disambiguation)